Ibtissam Marirhi (born 27 May 1989) is a Moroccan sports shooter. She competed in the women's skeet event at the 2020 Summer Olympics.

References

External links

 
 
 
 MARIRHI Ibtissam at Comité National Olympique Marocain 

1989 births
Living people
Moroccan female sport shooters
Olympic shooters of Morocco
Shooters at the 2020 Summer Olympics
Place of birth missing (living people)
African Games medalists in shooting
Competitors at the 2019 African Games
African Games gold medalists for Morocco
African Games silver medalists for Morocco
21st-century Moroccan women